Jackson Township is one of twelve townships in Steuben County, Indiana, United States. As of the 2010 census, its population was 1,777 and it contained 959 housing units.

Geography
Lakes in this township include Bass Lake, Beaverdam Lake, Deep Lake, Grass Lake, Hogback Lake, Howard Lake, Lake Arrowhead, Otter Lake, Pine Canyon Lake, Shallow Lake and Stayner Lake.

Unincorporated towns
 Flint at 
 Indian Hills at 
 Inverness at 
(This list is based on USGS data and may include former settlements.)

Adjacent townships
 Millgrove Township (north)
 Jamestown Township (northeast)
 Pleasant Township (east)
 Steuben Township (southeast)
 Salem Township (south)
 Milford Township, LaGrange County (southwest)
 Springfield Township, LaGrange County (west)
 Greenfield Township, LaGrange County (northwest)

Cemeteries
The township contains three cemeteries: Flint, Jackson Prairie and Lake Gage.

Major highways
  Indiana State Road 327

Airports and landing strips
 Tri-State Steuben County Airport

References
 
 United States Census Bureau cartographic boundary files

External links
 Indiana Township Association
 United Township Association of Indiana
 1880 Map Of Jackson Township

Townships in Steuben County, Indiana
Townships in Indiana